George Earl "Trey" Kell III (born April 5, 1996) is an American-born naturalized Syrian professional basketball player who last played for the South East Melbourne Phoenix of the Australian National Basketball League (NBL). He has previously played in Canada, Bosnia, Poland and Hong Kong. He played college basketball for the San Diego State Aztecs.

In international competition, he competes for the Syria national basketball team, since obtaining a Syrian passport in 2020.

Early life
Kell attended St. Augustine High School in San Diego. As a junior, he led St. Augustine to a 29-4 record and a CIF Division III state title. He was ranked the No. 13 shooting guard in his class by Scout.com, and the 79th ranked player overall by ESPN. On October 1, 2013, Kell verbally committed to San Diego State, picking the Aztecs over offers from Vanderbilt, Gonzaga and Oregon.

College career
As a freshman, Kell posted 5.6 points, 2.8 rebounds, and 1.6 assists per game and was named to the Maui Invitational all-tournament team. He helped San Diego State reach the NCAA Tournament as freshmen and beat St. John's in the first round. Kell averaged 12.6 points, 3.7 rebounds and 1.4 assists per game while starting all 38 games as a sophomore. He was named to the First Team All-Mountain West Conference. As a junior, Kell was named to the Third Team All-Mountain West Conference. He was also named (NABC) All-District 17 Second Team for the second straight season. Kell led the Aztecs in points per game (13.2), assists (2.9), steals (1.4) and free-throw percentage (.766) as a junior. 

Kell had an injury-shortened senior season, missing time with an ankle injury suffered in a January 27, 2018, loss to UNLV. When he returned, the team went on a nine-game winning streak. Kell scored a career-high 28 points in the 82–75 victory over New Mexico for the Mountain West championship to send the team to the NCAA Tournament. He was named Mountain West tournament MVP. As a senior, he averaged 10.5 points, 4.1 rebounds and 4.1 assists per game.

Professional career
On July 31, 2018, Kell officially started his professional career by signing with the Bosnian team Igokea. He chose Igokea over offers from nine other European teams. Kell was released a month later due to a knee injury and joined the Moncton Magic of NBL Canada midway through the season. He was named MVP of the Finals as the Magic defeated the St. John’s Edge in the clinching game behind 41 points, nine rebounds, six assists and three steals from Kell. In September 2019 he signed with  the Eastern Long Lions of the ASEAN Basketball League. In three games, Kell averaged 31.3 points, 8.3 rebounds, 5.0 assists, 1.0 steal and 1.0 block per game. He left the team on January 4, 2020.

On January 11, 2021, Kell signed with Stal Ostrów Wielkopolski of the Polish Basketball League (PLK).

On July 14, 2021, Kell signed for Pallacanestro Varese of the Italian Lega Basket Serie A (LBA). He averaged 15.3 points, 4.1 rebounds, 3.1 assists, and 1.2 steals per game. 

On January 2, 2022, Kell signed with Olimpia Milano. On June 27, 2022, he parted ways with the Italian club.

On July 14, 2022, Kell signed with the South East Melbourne Phoenix in Australia for the 2022–23 NBL season. He missed the start of the regular season after suffering a broken rib during pre-season.

National team career
On October 26, 2020, Kell agreed with the Syrian Basketball Federation to represent the Syria national basketball team in international competitions. He made his debut on November 28, 2020, when he recorded 35 points, 6 rebounds and 6 assists in a game against Qatar in the 2021 FIBA Asia Cup qualification.

References

External links 
San Diego State Aztecs bio

1996 births
Living people
ABA League players
American expatriate basketball people in Australia
American expatriate basketball people in Bosnia and Herzegovina
American expatriate basketball people in Canada
American expatriate basketball people in Hong Kong
American expatriate basketball people in Poland
American men's basketball players
ASEAN Basketball League players
Basketball players from San Diego
Eastern Sports Club basketball players
KK Igokea players
Moncton Magic players
Olimpia Milano players
San Diego State Aztecs men's basketball players
Shooting guards
South East Melbourne Phoenix players
Stal Ostrów Wielkopolski players
Syrian men's basketball players